Sri Lanka contested in the 2016 South Asian Games in Guwahati and Shillong, India from 5 February to 16 February 2016. The team consisted of 484 athletes (257 men and 227 women) in all 23 sports. Athlete Manjula Kumara was the country's flagbearer during the opening ceremony.

Medal summary

Medal table

Medalists

Archery

Athletics

Sri Lanka's team consists of 69 athletes (41 men and 28 women)

Men
Himasha Eashan (100m, 4X100m)
Mohommed Ashraful (100m, 4X100m)
Vinoj Suranjaya Silva (200m, 4X100m)
Mohommed Rajaskhan (200m)
Dilip Ruwan (400m, 4X400m)
Ajith Premakumara (400m, 4x400m)
Indunil Herath (800m),
Hemantha Kumara (800m)
Chinthaka Somawardana (1500m)
Sanjeewa Lakmal (1500m)
M.S. Pushpakumara (5000m)
G.N. Bandara (5000m)
Lionel Samarajeewa (10,000m)
Saman Kumara (10,000m)
Anuradha Cooray (Marathon)
Amila Kumara (Marathon)
Hasith Nirmal (110m Hurudles)
Saliya Randeewa (110m Hurdles)
Aravinda Chathuranga (400m Hurdles)
C.R. Seneviratne (400m Hurdles)
Manjula Kumara (High Jump)
A.K. Pathirana (High Jump)
Ishara Sandaruwan (Pole Vault)
A.C. Fernando (Pole Vault)
D.M. Liyanapathiranage (Long Jump)
Amila Jayasiri (Long Jump)
Eranda Fernando (Triple Jump)
Dulan Thilakaratne (Triple Jump)
Joy Dhanushka Perera (Shot Put)
U.P. Jayawardana (Discus Throw)
Sisira Kumara (Hammer Throw)
E.P. Alanson (Hammer Throw)
Sumeda Ranasinghe (Javelin Throw)
Sampath Ranasinghe (Javelin Throw)
Shehan Ambepitiya (4x100m)
S.L. Wickramasinghe (4X100m)
Umanga Surendra (4X100m)
Kasun Seneviratne (4X400m)
Kalinga Kumarage (4x400m)
Madhumal Peries (4X400m)
Anjana Gunarathne (4X400m)

Women
Rumeshika Rathnayake (100m, 200m, 4X100m)
Chamali Priyadarshani (100m, long jump, 4X100m)
S.S. Jayathilaka (200m, 4X100m)
Chandrika Rasnayake (400m, 4x400m)
Omaya Udayangani (400m, 4x400m)
Nimali Liyanarachchi (800m)
Gayanthika Abeyrathne (800m, 1500m, 4X400m)
Nilani Rathnayake (1500m, 5000m)
S.A. Lamahewage (10,000m)
Niluka Geethani Rajasekara (Marathon)
Lakmini Anuradhi (Marathon)
Ireshani Rajasinghe (100m Hurdles)
Lakshika Sugandhi (100m Hurdles, 4X100m)
Eranga Dulakshi (400m Hurdles)
Kaushalya Madushani (400m Hurdles)
Tharanga Vinodani (High Jump)
Dulanjali Ranasinghe (High Jump)
Sarangi Silva (Long Jump)
Vidusha Lakshani (Triple Jump)
Hashini Balasooriya (Triple Jump)
Tharika Fernando (Shot Put)
Nadeeka Lakmali (Javelin Throw)
Dilhani Lekamge (Javelin Throw)
Nadeeshani Waragoda (4X100m)
S.L. Vidanaduruge (4X100m)
Geethani Pathmakumari (4X400m)
Upamali Rathnakumari (4X400m)
Nirmali Madushika (4X400m)

Badminton

Boxing

Cycling

Field hockey

Men's tournament

Women's tournament 
Sri Lanka's women's team was announced on 3 February 2016.

Geethani Abeyratne
Yamuna Wijesuriya
Jeewanthi Keerthiratne
Buddhika Gunaratne
Pradeepa Nilmini
Harshani Wickremasinghe
Shanika Upeksha
Geethika Damayanthi
Nawanjana Ekanayake
Sandaruwani Jayaratne
Sakuntala Illeperuma
I.D. Weerabahu
Chathurika Wijesuriya
Madhushani Jayanetti
C.T. Themiyadasa
C.D. Premasiri

Football

Men's tournament 

Women's tournament

Handball

Judo

Kabbadi

Kho-Kho

Shooting

Squash

Swimming

Table tennis

Taekwondo

Tennis

Sri Lanka's team consists of eight athletes (four men and four women).

Men
Harshana Godamanne
Dinesh Thangarajah
Sharmal Dissanayake
Yasitha de Silva

Women
Amritha Muttaih
Medhira Samarasinghe
Thisuri Molligoda
Nethmie Waduge

Triathlon

Volleyball

Weightlifting

Sri Lanka's team consists of fifteen athletes (eight men and seven women).

Men

Women

Wrestling

Wushu

See also
Sri Lanka at the 2016 Summer Olympics

References

Nations at the 2016 South Asian Games
2016
South Asian Games